The Suzuki Across may refer to:

 Suzuki Across (motorcycle), a sport bike produced by Suzuki from 1990 until 1998
 Suzuki Across (crossover), a compact crossover SUV based on the Toyota RAV4 produced since 2020